Tasmannia is a genus of woody, evergreen flowering plants of the family Winteraceae. The 40 species of Tasmannia are native to Australia, New Guinea, Sulawesi, Borneo, and the Philippines. The Winteraceae are magnoliids, and are associated with the humid Antarctic flora of the Southern Hemisphere. The members of the family generally have aromatic bark and leaves, and some are used to extract essential oils. The peppery-flavored fruits and leaves (especially dried) of this genus are increasingly used as a condiment in Australia. The peppery flavour can be attributed to polygodial.

Taxonomy
The first description of the genus was published by Robert Brown.
The species of Tasmannia were formerly classified in genus Drimys, a related group of Winteraceae native to the Neotropics.  Recent studies have led to an increasing consensus among botanists to split the genus into two, with the Neotropical species remaining in genus Drimys, and the Australasian species classified in genus Tasmannia.

List of Tasmannia species
36 species are currently accepted:

Distribution and habitat
In Australia, the genus Tasmannia ranges from Tasmania and eastern Victoria and New South Wales to southeastern Queensland, and in the mountains of northeastern Queensland, where it grows in moist mountain forests and in wet areas in the drier forest and along watercourses to an elevation of 1500 m (5000 ft).

Culinary use
'Tasmanian pepper' or 'mountain pepper' (T. lanceolata, often referred to as Drimys lanceolata or T. aromatica) was the original pepperbush used by colonial Australians, and was introduced into cultivation in Cornwall, UK, to become the 'Cornish pepperleaf' associated with Cornish cuisine.  It has large, peppery berries which are also high in antioxidants.  Safrole is the biggest limitation with using wild strains of mountain pepper, and safrole-free strains of mountain pepper have been selected for the spice trade.

Tasmannia stipitata, Dorrigo pepper, is also sold as a spice and was the original pepperbush used in specialty native food restaurants in the 1980s.  Dorrigo pepper is safrole free and has a strong peppery flavour.

See also 
 Bushtucker

References

Notes

Bibliography 
 Doust, Andrew N. and Drinnan, Andrew N., 2004. Floral development and molecular phylogeny support the generic status of Tasmannia (Winteraceae). American Journal of Botany 91: 321–331.
 Sampson, F.B., Williams, J.B. and Woodland, Poh S., The Morphology and Taxonomic Position of Tasmannia glaucifolia (Winteraceae), 1988. A New Australian Species. Australian Journal of Botany 36 (4): 395–414.
 Smith, Keith and Irene.  1999.  Grow your own bushfoods.  New Holland Publishers, Sydney, Australia.
 Robins, Juleigh.  1996.  Wild Lime: Cooking from the bushfood garden.  Allen & Unwin Pty Ltd, Sydney, Australia.
 Bryant, Geoff.  2005.  The Random House Encyclopedia of Australian Native Plants.  Random House, Sydney, Australia.
 Australian Broadcasting Corporation.  Flora's native plants.  ABC Books, Sydney, Australia.
 Low, Tim.  1991.  Wild food plants of Australia.  Angus & Robertson Publishers, Sydney, Australia.

External links
 Tasmannia purpurascens (Australian National Botanic Gardens)
 Gernot Katzer's Spice Pages: Tasmanian Pepper
 Australian Bushfood and Native Medicine Forum: Do we have a native pepper?
 Diemen Pepper: Plant information

 
Canellales genera